Hubertus Cornelis Antonius Ernst  (8 April 1917 – 19 May 2017) was a Dutch prelate of the Roman Catholic Church. A centenarian, he was the oldest Dutch Roman Catholic bishop at the time of his death in 2017.

Life
Ernst had his seminary years in the Diocese of Breda and was ordained a priest on 7 June 1941. Later he taught moral theology at the diocesan seminary although he never went to a university or any school for further theological training. Ernst, at the time vicar-general of the Diocese of Breda, was appointed bishop of the same Diocese on 3 November 1967 after the sudden death of his predecessor, Gerardus Henricus De Vet; he was consecrated by Cardinal Bernard Alfrink on 17 December the same year. He remained bishop of the Diocese of Breda until retirement on 6 May 1992. He stayed on running the Diocese, however, as an Apostolic Administrator for another two and a half years. Ernst himself consecrated his successor, Martinus Petrus Maria Muskens in 1994, and was in 2007 also Co-Consecrator when the latter resigned and consecrated the current dignitary Hans van den Hende. He turned 100 in April 2017 and died a month later.

Pax Christi
In 1976 the Dutch Catholic Peace Movement, Pax Christi, asked Ernst to be the next president of its organisation, becoming Alfrink's successor. Ernst, former Professor of Moral Theology at the Diocesan Seminary, had always cherished strong views on for instance nuclear pacifism. Even after his retirement as a bishop and after the end of his presidency at Pax Christi he spoke out vehemently against President George W. Bush's War on Terror. In his opinion such views contradicted the moral teaching of the Catholic Church as has been said in § 112 of the encyclical Pacem in terris of Pope John XXIII.

See also
Diocese of Breda

References

External links
Catholic-Hierarchy
Diocese Site

1917 births
2017 deaths
20th-century Roman Catholic bishops in the Netherlands
People from Breda
Dutch centenarians
Men centenarians